Orven is a cycling team based in Mexico. It ranked 6th in the 2012 Vuelta Mexico Telmex

History
In 1991, Orven came in sixth place in the Mexico Route. In 2006, the team was reformed.

Team 
 Orlando Hernández 
 Patricio Portales Valle 
 Andrés Rivera 
 Juan José Nájera Oviedo  
 Enrique Serrato 
 Ronaldo López

References

Cycling teams based in Mexico
Cycling teams established in 2009